René Auguste Gardien (10 February 1928 – 1 February 2006) was a French footballer who played as a forward, most notably at FC Sochaux, and scored 122 league goals and 2 international goals. He later became a manager.

Playing career
Gardien played for Sochaux from July 1947 to June 1959, and then one season each at Lille and Besançon. He played for the France national team in two friendlies in 1953, scoring 2 goals in the first, against Wales.

Managerial career
From 1962 to 1969, Gardien was a manager at Thiers. After one season managing at Grenoble, he managed Lille from 1970 to 1973, Montluçon from 1974 to 1983, and Clermont from 1988 to 1990.

Honours
Sochaux
 Coupe de France: finalist 1959

External links
 Player profile at FFF
 Manager profile at Footballdatabase.eu

1928 births
2006 deaths
Sportspeople from Chambéry
French footballers
Footballers from Auvergne-Rhône-Alpes
Association football forwards
France international footballers
Ligue 1 players
FC Sochaux-Montbéliard players
Lille OSC players
Racing Besançon players
French football managers
Grenoble Foot 38 managers
Lille OSC managers
Clermont Foot managers